Katta Belisynyk Pass is a pass in the Belisynyk Range of the Batken Region of Kyrgyzstan.

References

Mountain passes of Kyrgyzstan